The Heathens of Kummerow is a 1967 East German-West German family comedy film directed by Werner Jacobs and starring Paul Dahlke, Ralf Wolter and Fritz Tillmann. It is an adaptation of the novel of the same name, written by Ehm Welk and published in 1937.

The film's sets were designed by the art directors Senta Ochs and Alfred Tolle. Location shooting took place around Rügen.

Plot
It is the era before World War I and short before Easter in the village of Kummerow in Pomerania, and a group of boys revive a custom of "heathen baptism". It is said that the villagers had resisted Christianization by remaining in the water during the baptism, which lived on as a traditional contest where boys will stand in the cold water, and the one who endures the longest is crowned "heathen king". This practice is not appreciated by the local pastor, although when the pastor and the illegally employed cowherd Krischan get into trouble with the miller Düker, the boys' talent for playing pranks comes in handy.

Cast
Paul Dahlke as Pastor Breithaupt
Ralf Wolter as Krischan
Fritz Tillmann as Müller Düker
Rainer Penkert as Grambauer
Theo Lingen as Sanftleben
Günther Jerschke as Niemeier
Wolfgang Jansen as Josef
Jochen Sehrndt as Christian Wendland
Hans Klering as Nachtwächter Bärensprung
Horst Kube as Bauer Trebbin
Irene Korb as Hermine Breithaupt
Tatjana Iwanow as Frau Düker
Angela Brunner as Luise Bärensprung
Erika Müller-Fürstenau as Frau Grambauer
Karin Heidemann as Ulrike Breithaupt
Wolfgang Hinz as Hermann
Jörg Resler as Martin Grambauer
Gerald Schraml as Johannes
Hans Bosenius as Kantor Kannegiesser
Günter Drescher as Bauer Fiebelkorn
Nico Turoff as Wirt Krüger
Albert Zahn as Otto Kienbaum

Production
The film is based on the 1937 novel The Heathens of Kummerow by Ehm Welk. The book was the third best selling novel written in Nazi Germany, and along with other novels by the apolitical humourist Welk, it became a modern classic in East Germany. The film adaptation was the first film co-produced by East and West Germany.

References

External links

1967 films
1960s children's comedy films
German historical films
1960s historical films
German comedy films
German children's films
West German films
East German films
1960s German-language films
Films directed by Werner Jacobs
Films based on German novels
Films set in the 1880s
Films set in Prussia
1967 comedy films
DEFA films
Constantin Film films
1960s German films